Rupert Norfolk (UK) is an artist based in London. His work is mainly sculptural and investigates the perceptual and conceptual possibilities of concrete and depicted things. Norfolk uses a wide range of processes, such as drawing, Tapestry weaving, stone carving, airbrushing, casting and computer aided technologies.

Education
He received his BA from Chelsea School of Art and Design in 1996.

Selected exhibitions

References

External links
Article from TheFreeLibrary.com
Images, texts and biography from the Saatchi Gallery
Rupert Norfolk on ArtFacts.net
Waste Material at The Drawing Room

British sculptors
British male sculptors
Living people
1974 births